The 2019 Oceania Sevens Championship was the twelfth Oceania Sevens tournament in men's rugby sevens. It served as the regional qualifier for the 2020 Tokyo Olympic Sevens and was held at ANZ Stadium in Suva, Fiji on 7–9 November. A competition for deaf teams was also included as part of the 2019 Oceania Sevens.

Australia won the main men's tournament to claim their fourth Oceania Championship, defeating Fiji by 22–7 in the final. As the highest-placed side not already qualified, Australia also won the Oceania berth at the 2020 Olympic Sevens in Tokyo.

Samoa and Tonga finished fourth and fifth respectively and, as the second and third highest-placed sides not already qualified, won entry to the 2020 Final Olympic Qualifier.

Tonga and Papua New Guinea, as the two highest-placed sides without core status on the World Rugby Sevens Series, won entry to the 2020 Challenger Series for a chance to qualify for the 2020–21 World Sevens Series.

Teams
Fifteen national teams competed at the 2019 tournament, including an invited sevens development side from Japan:

Format
Teams were seeded into three pools of five.

To allow a clear run for countries competing for qualification to the 2020 Olympic Sevens, the two Oceania nations already qualified, Fiji and New Zealand, were placed in Pool A together with the invited development side from Japan, New Caledonia (not Olympic eligible) and Niue. The remaining teams were seeded into Pool B and Pool C.

A playoff between the winners of Pool B and Pool C decided the Olympic qualifying berth.

Pool stage

Pool A (International)

Pool B (Olympic)

Pool C (Olympic)

Knockout stage

Lower classification

Middle classification

Fifth place match

Title playoffs

Placings

Source:

See also
 2019 Oceania Women's Sevens Championship

Notes

References

2019
Rugby sevens at the 2020 Summer Olympics – Men's qualification
2019 rugby sevens competitions
2019 in Oceanian rugby union
2019 in Fijian rugby union
International rugby union competitions hosted by Fiji
Sport in Suva
November 2019 sports events in Oceania